Saint-Antoine-l'Abbaye, also Saint-Antoine-en-Viennois, is a commune in the Isère department in southeastern France. On 31 December 2015, the former commune of Dionay was merged into Saint-Antoine-l'Abbaye.

Formerly known as La-Motte-Saint-Didier, it was renamed after becoming the home of purported relics of Saint Anthony the Great in the 11th century, and shortly afterwards of the original house of the Hospital Brothers of St. Anthony, founded here in 1095 as the result of miraculous cures from St. Anthony's Fire ascribed to the relics.

It was set up as a Benedictine community, whose monks cared for the shrine and the relics, while the Brothers cared for those suffering from the then common malady of St. Anthony's Fire. Over the course of the next two centuries, disputes between the Antonines and the Benedictines arose repeatedly. The Antonines were formed into an Order of canons regular in 1297. At that time the Benedictine monks were removed from the shrine, which was entrusted to the Antonines. In 1890 the Canons Regular of the Immaculate Conception were given the Abbey of St. Antony, which was the motherhouse of the congregation and it maintained that role from 1890 until 1903, when, following the anti-clerical laws passed by the French government in 1901, the community was transferred to Andora, in the Italian region of Liguria.

Monuments 
The village is since 2009 one of the most beautiful villages of France, and hosts many monuments, the most important of which are the abbey church and the abbey.

Population

Mayors

Twin towns
Saint-Antoine-l'Abbaye is twinned with:

  Sermoneta, Italy, since 2007

See also
Communes of the Isère department

References

External links
 http://www.musee-saint-antoine.fr/ 
 http://www.tourisme.pays-saint-marcellin.fr/

Anthony the Great
Communes of Isère
Isère communes articles needing translation from French Wikipedia
Plus Beaux Villages de France